The 1977 season was the original Tampa Bay Rowdies third season of existence, and their third season in the North American Soccer League, the top division of soccer in the United States and Canada at that time.

Overview
The year would see the Rowdies host friendlies against teams from the Soviet Union, Italy and China. The team also took part in the preseason Tournament of Champions, finishing as runners-up. In the NASL season, the Rowdies finished with 131 points and a record of 14–12, which placed them third in the Eastern Division of the Atlantic Conference. The point total qualified them for the playoffs. They lost in the first round of the playoffs to the Cosmos, 3–0. For the second consecutive season Tampa Bay lost in the playoffs to the eventual champion. For the third consecutive season South African striker, Derek Smethurst lead the club in scoring with 19 goals.

Club

Roster

Team management 
Eddie Firmani began the season as head coach, but abruptly resigned on June 3, a few days after a 4–2 victory over the Cosmos. The club’s record was 7–3 at the time. Team captain, Len Glover, who had been sidelined with an injury at the time, served as interim coach for one match, a loss to Rochester on June 5. Retired former Rowdies captain, John Boyle, was hired on June 9. Under Boyle the Rowdies record was 7–8, and though Tampa Bay made the playoffs, Boyle resigned to accept a position as the team’s permanent European scout after the season. For his part, Firmani re-immerged as the Cosmos coach (just as several of his former players had predicted in early June), and ultimately eliminated Tampa Bay, 3–0, in the first round of the 1977 playoffs. 

 George W. Strawbridge, Jr., owner
 Beau Rodgers, general manager
 Eddie Firmani, head coach (resigned June 3)
 Len Glover, head coach (interim)
 John Boyle, head coach (hired June 9)
 Ken Shields, trainer
 Francisco Marcos, public relations director
 Alfredo Beronda, equipment manager

Honors 
Four Rowdies received individual honors following the 1977 NASL season. 
 NASL All-Star, First Team: Derek Smethurst
 NASL All-Star, Second Team: Arsène Auguste
 NASL All-Star, Second Team: Rodney Marsh
 NASL All-Star, Second Team: Steve Wegerle

Competitions

Tournament of Champions 
The inaugural Tournament of Champions was a friendly two-day tournament hosted by the Cosmos at Giants Stadium on April 2 and 3. Four teams participated: the Cosmos, Tampa Bay, Toronto Metros-Croatia and Victory SC of Haiti. In the opening match the Rowdies and Metros-Croatia played to a scoreless draw, before Tampa Bay won using the NASL’s new shoot-out tiebreaker, 2–1. This put the Rowdies into the finals vs. the Cosmos the following day. The Rowdies lost the match, 2–1, and were runners-up. Their lone goal came from Wes McLeod with an assist by Farrukh Quraishi.

Series results

Other friendlies 
Tampa Bay hosted three international friendlies in 1977. The first was a, 1–0, losing effort on March 5 versus FC Zenit Leningrad. A crowd of more than 41,000 attended the preseason match. The second international was midseason match-up versus A.S. Roma on June 14. They drew with the Italians, 1–1. Adrian Alston scored for the Rowdies on 30-yard free kick. The third was played on October 13, and pitted the Rowdies against the Chinese National Team. Boris Bandov scored for Tampa Bay in the, 2–1, loss.

The Rowdies also played a postseason friendly versus the Dallas Tornado in Tulsa, Oklahoma five days after the match against China. The game was meant to serve as a test balloon to see if Tulsa would support soccer. Tampa Bay won, 1–0, on an early second half goal by Mark Lindsay. The game drew 11,147 fans. Team Hawaii owner and potato chip magnate, Ward Lay soon moved his club, redubbing them the Tulsa Roughnecks.

Results

North American Soccer League season
The Rowdies finished the regular season with 131 points placing them in 3rd place in the Eastern Division of the Atlantic Conference, and 7th out of 18 teams in the league overall. After a 7–3 start to the season, which put them at the top of the league standings, Tampa Bay limped home with a 7–9 record the rest of the way for a record of 14–12. The team’s midseason slump coincided exactly with Eddie Firmani’s abrupt resignation as head coach. The club averaged 19,491 fans per game, with three matches surpassing 21,000, one reaching 33,000 and still another topping 45,000.

Regular-season standings 
W = Wins, L = Losses, GF = Goals For, GA = Goals Against, BP = Bonus Points, Pts= point system

6 points for a win, 0 points for a loss, 1 point for each regulation goal scored up to three per game.
-League Premiers (most points). -Other playoff teams.

Regular season results

Playoff results

Statistics

Season scoring
GP = Games Played, G = Goals (worth 2 points), A = Assists (worth 1 point), Pts = Points

Season goalkeeping
Note: GP = Games played; Min = Minutes played; GA = Goals against; GAA = Goals against average; W = Wins; L = Losses

Player movement

In

Out

See also 

 1977 North American Soccer League season
 1977 in American soccer
 Tampa Bay Rowdies (1975–1993)

References 

 1977 Rowdies results

Tampa Bay Rowdies
1977
Tampa Bay Rowdies (1975–1993) seasons
Tampa Bay Rowdies
Tampa Bay Rowdies
Sports in Tampa, Florida